The Nehru Bridge is a major bridge over the river Sabarmati, and serves as an artery of major public transport for the city of Ahmedabad in the state of Gujarat, India. Built in the 1960s, it is a modern and larger bridge compared to the landmark Ellis Bridge, and is dedicated to Jawaharlal Nehru, India's first prime minister.

One of the attractions of Ahmedabad City, the Patang Revolving Restaurant is situated near Nehru Bridge on the banks of Sabarmati River.

References

Bridges in Ahmedabad
Bridges completed in the 1960s
1960s establishments in Gujarat
Year of establishment missing
20th-century architecture in India